Morinda is a genus of flowering plants.

Morinda may also refer to:

 Morinda, Punjab, a town in the Rupnagar District in the Indian state of Punjab
 Morinda, Inc., a multi-level marketing company

See also
 Moringa, a genus of flowering plants